SC Weiche Flensburg 08 is a German association football club from the Weiche suburb of Flensburg, Schleswig-Holstein. Apart from football the club also offers other sports like volleyball and table tennis.

Before July 2017, the club was known as ETSV Weiche. The club's greatest success has been to earn promotion to the tier four Regionalliga Nord in 2012. The club is associated with the German railways, as evident by the term railway sports club in its former prefix ETSV (German: Eisenbahner Turn- und Sportverein). Weiche is the German term for railroad switch but also the name of the Flensburg suburb the club hails from.

History

The club was formed as Reichsbahn-Sportverein Flensburg-Weiche in 1908. Three years later, in 1933, the Weiche was affected by the rise of the Nazis to power and came under the control of the Reichssportführer. By 1940, with the effects of the Second World War, activities within the club came to a standstill. Despite early efforts after the war in 1945 the club took until April 1947 to reform, now as ESV Flensburg-Weiche. The football department however left the club in 1949 to form TSV Weiche-West. From 1962 onwards the two clubs started discussing a merger for the first time. Animosity between the two clubs however prevented progress until 1971, when the two finally agreed on a merger.

The football department of ETSV Weiche was formed in 1932 but left the club in 1949 to form the TSV Weiche-West. In 1957 this team won the local Kreisliga and earned promotion to the tier three 2. Amateurliga Schleswig-Holstein Nord. Weiche-West played in this league until it was renamed to Bezirksliga Schleswig-Holstein Nord in 1968, with a runners-up finish in 1961 as its best result. The club continued in the Bezirksliga after 1968, from 1971 onwards as ETSV Weiche. Throughout the 26 seasons in the 2. Amateurliga and Bezirksliga the club rarely challenged for the championship but, in 1982–83, it finally won this league and earned promotion to the Landesliga Schleswig-Holstein Nord. In this league, in 1983–84, the club came a distant last and was promptly relegated again. Another decade in the Bezirksliga followed until Weiche could win the league again in 1994 and return to the Landesliga. Three Landesliga seasons followed in which the club struggled against relegation each year and finally dropped down again in 1997. Weiche missed out on a place in the new Bezirksoberliga in 1999, a league that replaced the Landesliga above the Bezirksliga but won the later in the following year and was promoted again.

Weiche spend the next seven seasons in the Bezirksoberliga, winning the league in 2006–07 and qualifying for the Verbandsliga Schleswig-Holstein, the states highest league, for the first time. The 2007–08 season was the last of the Verbandsliga in this format. From 2008 the league was renamed Schleswig-Holstein-Liga and the four leagues below received the name Verbandsliga. Weiche did not qualify for the new league and had to stay at Verbandsliga level, being grouped in the Verbandsliga Schleswig-Holstein-Nord-West. It came second in its Verbandsliga division in 2009 and was promoted to the Schleswig-Holstein-Liga. Three seasons at this level followed before the 2011–12 season saw the club finish runners-up in the Schleswig-Holstein-Liga and being promoted alongside champions VfR Neumünster.

Since 2012 the club has played in the tier four Regionalliga Nord, finishing in the upper half of the table each season. In March 2016 it was announced that the club planned a merger with local rival Flensburg 08, and in November of that year both clubs agreed that Flensburg 08 would be merged into ETSV Weiche at the end of June 2017. The club subsequently changed its name into SC Weiche Flensburg 08.

Current squad

Honours
The club's honours:
 Regionalliga Nord
 Champions: 2017–18
 Schleswig-Holstein-Liga
 Runners-up: 2012
 Verbandsliga Schleswig-Holstein-Nord (formerly Nord-West)
 Runners-up: 2009
 2. Amateurliga Schleswig-Holstein Nord
 Runners-up: 1961
 Bezirksoberliga Nord
 Champions: 2002, 2007
 Bezirksliga Nord
 Champions: 1983, 1994, 2000
 Runners-up: 1987
 Schleswig-Holstein Cup
 Champions: 1957, 2018, 2021

Recent seasons
The recent season-by-season performance of the club:

With the introduction of the Regionalligas in 1994 and the 3. Liga in 2008 as the new third tier, below the 2. Bundesliga, all leagues below dropped one tier.

Key

References

External links
 Official team site
 Official website of the football department
 Das deutsche Fußball-Archiv historical German domestic league tables

Football clubs in Germany
Football clubs in Schleswig-Holstein
Association football clubs established in 1908
1908 establishments in Germany
Railway sports clubs in Germany
Sport in Flensburg